Fuente Vaqueros is a farming village in the province of Granada, Spain. It lies 17 km west of the city of Granada. Its population was recorded in 2005 as 4,590. The principal crops are asparagus, olives and apples.

It is the birthplace of the twentieth-century poet Federico García Lorca. His birthplace is now a museum, the Museo Casa Natal Federico García Lorca. For the feast of La Candelaria (Candlemas), the Ayuntamiento distributes wine and hundreds of kilos of potatoes.

References

External links 

 Página web del Excmo. Ayuntamiento de Fuente Vaqueros
 Página web del Patronato Cultural Federico García Lorca
 Historia, fiestas, lugares de interés y gastronomía de Fuente Vaqueros
 Museo Casa Natal Federico García Lorca

Municipalities in the Province of Granada